Pampos Papageorgiou (born 15 June 1963) is a Cypriot politician who has been Progressive Party of Working People (AKEL) member of the House of Representatives for Kyrenia since May 2011. He was educated at the National and Kapodistrian University of Athens, King's College London (MA, Philosophy) and University College London (PhD, Political Philosophy).

He teaches philosophy at European University Cyprus.

References 

1963 births
Living people
National and Kapodistrian University of Athens alumni
Alumni of King's College London
Alumni of University College London
Members of the House of Representatives (Cyprus)
Progressive Party of Working People politicians
People from Nicosia District